In the Guide Movement, a Chief Guide is the uniformed head of a national Guiding organisation. Olave Baden-Powell, wife of Robert Baden Powell became the first Chief Guide in 1918.

World Chief Guide 
1930 - 1977 Olave Baden-Powell (only holder of this post)

UK Chief Guides 
1910 - 1916 Agnes Baden-Powell

1916 - 1930 Olave Baden-Powell

1930 - 1939 Mrs Percy Birley

1939 - 1942 Mrs St John Atkinson

1942 - 1949 Finola, Lady Summers

1949 - 1956 The Lady Stratheden and Campbell

1956 - 1966 Anstice Gibbs

1966 - 1975 Ann Parker Bowles

1975 - 1980 Sheila Walker

1980 - 1985 Lady Patience Baden-Powell

1985 - 1990 June Paterson-Brown

1990 - 1995 Jane Garside

1995 - 1996 Margaret Wright

1996 - 2001 Bridget Towle

2001 - 2006 Jenny Leach

2006 - 2011 Liz Burnley

2011 - 2016 Gill Slocombe

2016 - 2017 Valerie Le Vaillant

2018 - Amanda Medler

Austria 
 Charlotte Teuber-Weckersdorf

Gambia 
 Rosamond Fowlis

See also 
 Chief Scout (The Scout Association)

References 

Girl Guiding and Girl Scouting